Bristol Rovers W.F.C. are a women's association football club based in Bristol in the United Kingdom, and are affiliated to Bristol Rovers F.C. They are known colloquially as the Gas Girls in recognition of Bristol Rovers' unofficial nickname of The Gas.

History
Bristol Rovers Football Club launched their original women's team in 1998, and although they were successful (rising from the South West Combination to the top flight of women's football in England within five years) the financial situation within the football club in the mid-2000s led to the funding for the women's team being cut and them being renamed Bristol Academy W.F.C. in 2005, eventually being re-branded again as Bristol City in 2016.

In 2019, fourteen years after the name disappeared from women's football, it was announced that a new Bristol Rovers Women's team was being launched in time for the 2019–20 season and that they would be playing in the Gloucestershire County Women's Football League. The launch of the new Bristol Rovers Women's Team was Co-Founded by Club Secretary & Media Manager, Matthew Davies and First-Team Manager, Nathan Hallett-Young. The first team was eventually accepted into Division One of the Gloucestershire League and the development team was granted a place in Division Two and a new logo was commissioned, based on the Bristol Rovers club badge and featuring a female pirate. They play their home games at Lockleaze Sports Centre in the Lockleaze area of Bristol, and are funded by the Bristol Rovers Community Trust.

The first team played their first competitive match on 8 September 2019, a 5–0 win away to Abbeymead Rovers.

The 'Gas Girls' pride themselves on their four key values (Community, Education, Participation & Performance). In its first year, the club was awarded the 'Best Community Football Development Initiative Award' at the 2020 FA Women's & Girls Football Awards. In September 2020, the club also announced a community partnership with Bristol Pride and launched a special edition away shirt. This shirt was later inducted into the National Football Museum collection after being rated the ninth best shirt for the 2020–21 season by the museum who also named it the bespoke women's away shirt of the season.

After being top of the league in their first season when the season was annulled on account of the COVID-19 pandemic, in their second season the 'Gas Girls' were crowned champions. On 4 June 2021, it was confirmed that the FA had accepted the club's application for promotion to South West Regional Women's Football League Division One. On 13 February 2022, the club secured back-to-back promotions after a 4–0 victory over Weston Mendip Ladies with the 'Gas Girls' having needed only a point to win the title. This success was followed up seven weeks later when a 4–2 victory for the Development Squad saw them clinch the Gloucestershire County Women's League Division Two title.

The 'Gas Girls' campaign for Women's football and support for HerGameToo was encapsulated when Bristol Rovers Women played Forest Green Rovers Ladies for at The Memorial Stadium. The game took place after the men's edition of the fixture. Tickets bought for the men's game included a free ticket for the Women's game in an attempt to increase interest. The result was a resounding success, the score ended 3-1 to the 'Gas Girls' and was played in front of a crowd of 2,247.

Season by season

Notes

Players and staff

First team
Squad list last updated 12 November 2020

Development team
Squad list last updated 12 November 2020

Club staff

Honours

First team
Leagues
 SWRWFL Northern Division: Champions: 1 
 2021–22
 Gloucestershire League First Division: Champions: 1 
 2020–21

Development squad
Leagues
 Gloucestershire League Second Division: Champions: 1 
 2021–22

References

Association football clubs established in 2019
Women's football clubs in England
Football clubs in Bristol
Bristol Rovers F.C.
2019 establishments in England